The 620/720 class railcars were a class of diesel multiple unit built by the New South Wales Government Railways and operated from 1961 until 2007.

Construction
The 620/720 class railcars were an evolution of the 600/700 railcars that had been built in 1949/50. Like their predecessors they were built with an aluminium body on a steel frame at the New South Wales Government Railways' Chullora Railway Workshops. However they were fitted with different engines, six receiving two 8-cylinder Rolls-Royce C8SFLH with Rolls-Royce DFR 11500 transmissions, 11 receiving two 6-cylinder GM Detroit Diesel 6/110 with Allison RC3 transmissions and one receiving two 6-cylinder Cummins NHHRTO-6-B1 engines with Twin Disc DFFR 10034 transmissions.

History
The first five sets were ordered to operate suburban services out of Newcastle and were fitted with economy class seats throughout. The next six were constructed with both first and economy class accommodation to operate longer services out of Newcastle and between Liverpool and Campbelltown until the latter section was electrified in 1968. The remaining seven were constructed to operate regional services including :
Sydney Central to Lithgow via Goulburn and Cowra 
Grafton to Casino
Orange to Mudgee via Lithgow
Dubbo based services
Casino to Murwillumbah

From the mid-1970s, one was attached to the DEB set operating the Canberra Monaro Express during times of heavy demand. In late 1984, two were transferred to Wollongong from Lithgow joining three sets that had been there for many years. The balance of the fleet by this stage was all based in Newcastle.

Withdrawals and Upgrades

During the life of the class, three cars were damaged in accidents and withdrawn. NPF 624 was burnt out at Gosford in 1981, NTC 734 was damaged in a collision with a motor vehicle on the Gwabegar line in 1981 and subsequently withdrawn in 1983, while NTC 728 was damaged in a collision with a coal train at Hexham in 2002 and was not repaired. NPF 634 was matched with trailer NTC 724 and they operated as a mismatched set until they were withdrawn.

MPF 638 was fitted with Japanese Niigata DBRG2115 transmissions as a trial in 1978 and proving reasonably successful Niigata transmissions were deployed in some of the 900 Class power cars. Aging equipment plagued the Class in the 1970s and five units received 300 hp Cummins NTA-855-R2 engines and Twin Disc DFFR 10034 transmissions originally destined for upgrading the 600 Class power cars.

From the early 1980s, the remaining Rolls-Royce and GM powered units, along with Cummins powered NPF 638, were fitted with 335 hp Cummins NTA-855-R4 engines and Voith T211r transmissions. This drive train proved highly successful and was also deployed in the 900 Class power cars.

First 11 withdrawn
It was planned that all would be replaced by the 15 Endeavour railcars in 1994 but after it was decided to divert some of these to Main South line services, seven were retained, all in Newcastle. These were all overhauled by Rail Services Australia, Chullora in 1999 including a repaint into CityRail livery and fluorescent lights fitted. The seven sets remaining (621/721, 623/723, 625/725, 626/726, 628/728, 629/729 and 631/731) were based at the CityRail Endeavour Service Centre at Broadmeadow. These units, in conjunction with five Endeavour railcar sets provided services on the Hunter Valley network.

Final 7 withdrawn
Following the delivery of the Hunter railcars all were withdrawn in 2007, with the last service running on 29 October 2007 from Newcastle to Paterson and return.

Preservation

A few have been preserved:
621/721 has been designated a heritage item and placed in the care of the Rail Motor Society, Paterson and restored to operational condition in the Indian red colour scheme
622/727 preserved at Tenterfield station
623/723 has been designated a heritage item and placed in the care of the NSW Rail Museum, Thirlmere
625/725 Privately owned at the Canberra Railway Museum
626 by Goodwin Alco
726 by Lithgow State Mine Heritage Park & Railway (owned privately by a member; on long term hire to Byron Bay Train)
627/630 by Hills Transport, Tamworth
629/729 by Goodwin Alco
631/731 Privately owned, operational.
632/732 by New England Railway, Armidale
633/733 by the Dorrigo Steam Railway & Museum
638/738 by the Lachlan Valley Railway, Cowra

RailCorp has converted 631/731 to Mechanised Track Patrol Vehicle ML070 with 625/725 retained as a source of spares. Cooma Monaro Railway secured ownership of both in January 2015 and they were stored in the Cooma railway yard precinct. They were sold in 2020 to a private owner in Canberra who restored them to operational status and are currently leased.

The Lithgow State Mine Railway has been loaned 623/723 for restoration at Goulburn Railway Workshops, for eventual re-entering of service in Lithgow and the surrounding region. Following a breakdown in negotiations, 623/723 subsequently returned to Transport Heritage NSW at Thirlmere.

References

Diesel multiple units of New South Wales